Protambulyx strigilis, the streaked sphinx, is a moth of the family Sphingidae prevalent in the Americas from Florida to Central and South America. The species was first described by Carl Linnaeus in 1771.

Distribution
It is known from tropical and subtropical lowlands in Florida and throughout Central America and the West Indies south to Colombia, Ecuador, Peru, Bolivia, Venezuela, Guyana, Suriname, French Guiana, Brazil and Argentina.

Description
The wingspan is 108–134 mm. Adults are on wing in March and from June to July in Florida, year round in Costa Rica, from April to August and October to December in Bolivia, April in Brazil and June in Peru.

Habitat and cycle
The larvae have been recorded feeding on Spondias dulcis, S. mombin, S. purpurea, S. cytherea, Astronium graveolens, Anacardium occidentale, Comocladia dodonea, C. dentata, Metopium toxiferum, Simarouba glauca, S. amara, Erythroxylum havanense, Eupatorium villosum, Lycopersicon species, Sambucus australis and Schinus terebinthifolius. Later instar larvae hide at the bases of leaves or near the base of the tree trunk when not feeding.

References

External links
"Streaked sphinx (Protambulyx strigilis)" Moths of America. Archived May 20, 2006.

Protambulyx
Moths described in 1771
Moths of South America
Taxa named by Carl Linnaeus